Mary Grace "Meg" Baydal Imperial (born January 20, 1993) is a Filipino actress, dancer, singer, and model. She was known as QT in Midnight DJ, a defunct horror show of TV5. She was previously a Star Magic artist before transferring networks and is currently under Viva Artists Agency.

In December 2012, she was chosen to be the cover girl of FHM Philippines. From 2013 to 2014, she appeared in two afternoon TV series; an antagonist in Galema: Anak ni Zuma, followed by her first leading role as Ayla, "DJ Lav" who has hypertrichosis in Moon of Desire. The biggest break in her acting career was in the hit afternoon series, D' Originals in 2017.

In 2018, Meg played another lead role in the film, Jacqueline Comes Home. Rodney Torres did a photo shoot for Meg for the film.

Filmography

Television

Film

Music video

References

External links

1993 births
Living people
Actresses from Rizal
Filipina gravure idols
Filipino people of Spanish descent
Filipino television actresses
Filipino television personalities
TV5 (Philippine TV network) personalities
ABS-CBN personalities
GMA Network personalities
Viva Artists Agency
Filipino female dancers
Filipino film actresses